Horseshoe Island is an island in Green Bay in Door County, Wisconsin. The island is located offshore from Peninsula State Park and is part of the state park. The French explorer Jean Nicolet reportedly landed on the island. The island is part of the Town of Gibraltar, and lies offshore from the village of Ephraim, Wisconsin.

Climate

Gallery

References

External links 
 Horseshoe Island, Web-Map of Door County, Wisconsin

Islands of Door County, Wisconsin
Lake islands of Wisconsin
Islands of Lake Michigan in Wisconsin